Maryland Route 758 is a state highway located in Hanover in Anne Arundel County, Maryland. The route runs  from an intersection with Stoney Run Road and New Ridge Road north to a roundabout at Ridge Road. The road provides access to the Maryland Department of Transportation headquarters building. The state took over maintenance of Corporate Center Drive in 2012.

Route description

MD 758 begins at an intersection with Stoney Run Road and New Ridge Road in Hanover, Anne Arundel County a short distance to the west of Baltimore–Washington International Airport. From here, the route heads northeast on Corporate Center Drive, a four-lane divided highway. The road passes through wooded areas, becoming a three-lane road with a center left-turn lane and curving to the north. MD 758 turns northwest and passes by the Maryland Department of Transportation headquarters. The route passes by an office building before it reaches its northern terminus at a roundabout with Ridge Road.

History
MD 758 was assigned to Corporate Center Drive in 2012 when the state took over maintenance of the road following a donation.

Junction list

See also

References

758
Maryland Route 758